Jessie Mary Hayward (née Donaghy, born 7 December 1939) is a former New Zealand high jumper and long jumper. She represented her country at the 1956 Summer Olympics and 1958 British Empire and Commonwealth Games, winning a silver medal in the high jump at the latter event.

Early life and family
Hayward was born Jessie Mary Donaghy in Thames on 7 December 1939, the daughter of Nona Jessie Donaghy (née Baverstock) and James Stanly Donaghy. She grew up on her parents' farm at Waitakaruru, near Ngatea. After leaving school she worked in Ngatea for a motor company, before moving to Auckland in 1960 where she worked for a bank. In 1963, she married a dairy and poultry farmer, John Clive Hayward, and they lived on their farm at Netherton, near Paeroa.

Athletics
At an athletics meet in Te Aroha in January 1955, Donaghy jumped  at an event won by the national champion, Noelene Swinton, who suggested that Hayward should seek coaching from Frank Sharpley. For the next four years, Hayward had weekly training sessions with Sharpley at the Papakura Military Camp, where Sharpley was a physical trainer.

After just one session with Sharpley, Hayward leapt  at the Thames Valley children's championships in February 1955, breaking the New Zealand women's high jump record. She went on to win the New Zealand national high jump title six times, winning every year from 1955 to 1961 except 1960.

At 16 years old, Donaghy competed in the high jump at the 1956 Summer Olympics in Melbourne. Her best height of 1.67 m was the same as that of the silver medallists, but she finished in seventh place on a countback.

Donaghy retired from athletics competition after the 1961 New Zealand national championships.

Following her retirement and marriage, Hayward coached at the Paeroa Amateur Athletics Club.

References

1939 births
Living people
Sportspeople from Thames, New Zealand
New Zealand female high jumpers
New Zealand female long jumpers
New Zealand female sprinters
Commonwealth Games silver medallists for New Zealand
Athletes (track and field) at the 1958 British Empire and Commonwealth Games
Athletes (track and field) at the 1956 Summer Olympics
Commonwealth Games medallists in athletics
Olympic athletes of New Zealand
Medallists at the 1958 British Empire and Commonwealth Games